Netania Davrath (Нетания Доврат) (12 August 193111 April 1987) was a Ukrainian-born Israeli  soprano opera and concert singer.

Early life and study

In 1948, Davrath moved to Israel with her family. There, she studied in Jerusalem with Edith Boroschek. She subsequently studied in Düsseldorf and later at the Juilliard School in New York with Jennie Tourel, as well as in Italy.

Career

Davrath's repertoire included both opera and concert pieces. She collaborated with conductors Leonard Bernstein, John Barbirolli, Leopold Stokowski and Zubin Mehta and several orchestras: the New York Philharmonic, Chicago Symphony Orchestra, London Philharmonic, Israel Philharmonic, Lyric Opera of Chicago, and Opera Boston among others. She recorded ten discs under the Vanguard Classics label. Davrath was fluent in eight languages.

Her childhood years may have influenced her attraction to folk music – first in her native country Ukraine (then part of the Soviet Union), then later in Israel. These influences are reflected in her performance style; a delicate tone, clarity of enunciation, and agility. Her early recording of Joseph Canteloube's Chants d'Auvergne is considered by many to be unsurpassed.

References

External links

, from Chants d'Auvergne

1931 births
1987 deaths
Soviet emigrants to Israel
Soviet Jews
Israeli operatic sopranos
Israeli people of Ukrainian-Jewish descent
20th-century Israeli women opera singers
Jewish opera singers